Yuselmi Kristal Silva Dávila (born 26 December 1991) is a Mexican beauty pageant titleholder who won the Nuestra Belleza México 2016 pageant and represented Mexico at Miss Universe 2016 where she placed top 9.

Personal life and education
Silva graduated with honors and earned her degree in administration in 2016.

Pageantry
Prior to competing in the 65th edition of Miss Universe, Silva took part in Miss Earth 2013, where she placed as one of the top 8 finalists, representing Mexico.

Three years later, she was awarded the title of Nuestra Belleza México 2016, having competed in that pageant as the delegate of the northeastern state of Tamaulipas. She then went on to represent her country at Miss Universe 2016 where she ended as one of the top nine placers.

References

External links 
 Nuestra Belleza Mexico Official Page

1991 births
Living people
Nuestra Belleza México winners
People from Ciudad Victoria
Miss Universe 2016 contestants
Miss Earth 2013 contestants